Watson Lake is a town in Yukon, Canada, located at mile 635 on the Alaska Highway close to the British Columbia border. It has a population of 790 in 2016. The town is named for Frank Watson, an American-born trapper and prospector, who settled in the area at the end of the 19th century.

Watson Lake is near the Liard River, at the junction of the Robert Campbell Highway and the Alaska Highway. The town is also served by the Watson Lake Airport; the airport was formerly served by Canadian Pacific Air Lines and other local and regional airlines, but now by Air North and corporate and charter services.

Watson Lake is the main centre of the small forestry industry in Yukon and has been a service centre for the mining industry, especially for the Cassiar, a now abandoned asbestos mine in northern British Columbia and the Cantung Mine, a tungsten mine on the Yukon-Northwest Territories border in the Mackenzie Mountains.

Tourist attractions in Watson Lake include the Northern Lights Centre and the much-imitated original Sign Post Forest. The Sign Post Forest was started in 1942 by a homesick United States Army Corps of Engineers G.I. working on the Alaska Highway, who put up a sign with the name of his home town and the distance. Others followed suit and the tradition continues to this day. As of August 2010 there are more than 76,000 signs of various types depicting locations across the world. The Sign Post Forest is one of four roadside attractions featured on the first series of the Canadian Roadside Attractions Series issued by Canada Post on July 6, 2009.

Watson Lake and the neighbouring Upper Liard settlement are the home of the Liard River First Nation, a member of the Kaska Dena Council. The Two Mile area immediately north of the core of town is a concentrated area of First Nations residents, while the town extends  out to the turn-off of Airport Road. (Originally, Airport Road extended directly to the Alaska Highway, but most of it is now part of the Campbell highway.)

History 
The Town of Watson Lake annexed Two Mile and Two and One-Half Mile Village on January 2, 2016.

Geography

Climate 
Like most of Yukon, Watson Lake has a subarctic climate (Dfc) with mild to warm summers and severely cold, snowy winters.

Demographics 

Gallery

See also
List of municipalities in Yukon

References

External links 
www.watsonlake.cao 

Towns in Yukon